N. Kovaithangam ( – 12 October 2022) was an Indian politician.

Born in India. He was elected to the Tamil Nadu legislative assembly as a Tamil Maanila Congress candidate from Valparai constituency in 2001, and 2006 elections. On 23 March he joined DMK in presence of party president M. K. Stalin.

References 

1940s births
Year of birth missing
2022 deaths
People from Coimbatore district
Tamil Nadu MLAs 2001–2006
Tamil Nadu MLAs 2006–2011
Tamil Nadu politicians